The 2000 Bayern Rundfahrt was the 21st edition of the Bayern Rundfahrt cycle race and was held on 17 May to 21 May 2000. The race started in Burghausen and finished in Neustadt an der Aisch. The race was won by Jens Voigt.

General classification

References

Bayern-Rundfahrt
2000 in German sport